Pactolinus gigas is a species of the Histeridae family of Beetles.

Description
Pactolinus gigas has a black body, flat and ovoid. Elytra are shortened and antennae are elbowed with clubbed ends. The mandible mouthpart is well developed. These beetles feed on dung beetle larvae of the genus Ontophagus.

Distribution
This species can be found in the Tropical Africa.

References

Histeridae
Beetles described in 1811